The France national rugby team have competed in every Rugby World Cup since the tournament began in 1987. They are one of five teams who have played in the final match, having done so three times (1987, 1999 and 2011), losing and finishing second in the tournament each time. They have made it to at least the quarter-finals at every tournament.

France hosted the 2007 tournament, and co-hosted the 1991 competition with Ireland and the United Kingdom. They also hosted some matches of the 1999 event, where the main host was Wales. France will host again in 2023.

By position

By matches

1987

Pool

Knock-out stage
Quarter-final

Semi-final

Final

1991

Pool

Knock-out stages
Quarter-final

1995

Pool

Knock-out stages
Quarter-final

Semi-final

Third-place play-off

1999

Pool

Knock-out stage
Quarter-final

Semi-final

Final

2003

Pool

Knock-out stages
Quarter-final

Semi-final

Third-place play-off

2007

Pool

Knock-out stages
Quarter-final

Semi-final

Bronze final

2011

Pool

Knock-out stages
Quarter-final

Semi-final

Final

2015

Pool Stage

Quarter-final

2019

Notes:
As a result of inclement weather caused by Typhoon Hagibis this match was cancelled and awarded as a 0–0 draw.

Quarter-final

Hosting

The Rugby World Cup is held every four years, and tends to alternate between the northern and southern hemispheres. Every northern hemisphere tournament so far has been held in Europe, and in general, France usually hosts some games when it is held there.

1991 Rugby World Cup
England was main host in 1991, but other countries hosted some matches. France hosted Pool D, and two of the quarter-finals.

The following French stadiums were used (quarter final locations emboldened).

1999 Rugby World Cup
Wales was main host in 1999. Pool C games were hosted in France.

The following French stadiums were used (quarter-final locations in bold).

2007 Rugby World Cup
France was main host for the 2007 RWC. Some games were also held in Scotland and Wales.

It was announced in April 2003 that France had won the right to host the tournament. The tournament was moved to the proposed September–October dates with the tournament structure remaining as it was. It was also announced that ten French cities would be hosting games, with the final at the Stade de France. French Prime Minister Jean-Pierre Raffarin said that "this decision illustrates the qualities of our country and its capacity to host major sporting events...This World Cup will be the opportunity to showcase the regions of France where the wonderful sport of rugby is deeply rooted". French Sports Minister Jean-François Lamour said that "The organisation of this World Cup will shine over all of France because ten French towns have the privilege of organising matches and to be in the world's spotlight." French cities to host games are Bordeaux, Lens, Lyon, Marseilles, Montpellier, Nantes, St. Etienne, Toulouse and Paris, and it was also announced that the final would be at the Stade de France in Saint-Denis.

There was a substantial increase in the overall capacity of stadiums compared to the 2003 Rugby World Cup, as the smallest venue at the 2007 tournament will be 33,900. France won the right to host the event in 2003. Three matches were played at Cardiff's Millennium Stadium, two Pool B games that featured Wales and as well as a quarter-final. Two Pool C matches were held at Edinburgh's Murrayfield. Ireland were also offered to host matches at Lansdowne Road in Dublin, but had to decline the offer as construction work was scheduled to begin on the stadium. The semifinals and final were held at Stade de France, Saint-Denis.

The following stadiums were used (finals locations emboldened).

2023 Rugby World Cup
France will host the Rugby World Cup outright for the second time in 2023, however, hosting for the fourth time in total.

Portrayal on screen
France can be seen playing South Africa in the feature film Invictus based on the 1995 Rugby World Cup.

References

Bibliography
 Davies, Gerald (2004) The History of the Rugby World Cup (Sanctuary Publishing Ltd,
 Farr-Jones, Nick, (2003). Story of the Rugby World Cup, Australian Post Corporation,

France national rugby union team
Rugby World Cup by nation